Midland is an unincorporated community in Douglas County, Kansas, United States.  It is located two miles north of the city of Lawrence.

Geography
The climate in this area is characterized by hot, humid summers and generally mild to cool winters.  According to the Köppen Climate Classification system, Midland has a humid subtropical climate, abbreviated "Cfa" on climate maps.

References

Further reading

External links
 Douglas County maps: Current, Historic, KDOT

Unincorporated communities in Douglas County, Kansas
Unincorporated communities in Kansas